This is a list of schools in Mentougou District, Beijing.

Secondary schools
Note: In China the word 中学 zhōngxué, literally translated as "middle school", refers to any secondary school and differs from the American usage of the term "middle school" to mean specifically a lower secondary school or junior high school. 初中 chū​zhōng is used to refer to a lower secondary school.

 Beijing No. 8 High School Beijing West Campus (北京市第八中学京西校区)
 Beijing City Sanjiadian Railway High School (北京市三家店铁路中学)
 Beijing City Wang Ping High School (北京市王平中学)
 Beijing City Yuyuan High School (北京市育园中学)
 Beijing City Mentougou District Dayu High School (北京市门头沟区大峪中学) - Main Campus, West Campus (西校区), and Branch School (分校)
 Beijing City Mentougou District Jingshi Experimental High School (北京市门头沟京师实验中学)
 Beijing City Mentougou District Junzhuang High School (北京市门头沟区军庄中学)
 Beijing City Mentougou District Miaofengshan Ethnic High School (北京市门头沟区妙峰山民族学校)
 Beijing City Mentougou District Qingshui High School (北京市门头沟区清水中学)
 Beijing City Mentougou District Tanzhe Temple High School (北京市门头沟区潭柘寺中学)
 Beijing City Mentougou District Xinqiao Road High School (北京市门头沟区新桥路中学)
 Beijing City Mentougou District Zhaitang High School (北京市门头沟区斋堂中学)
 Capital Normal University Affiliated High School (首都师范大学附属中学) Yongding Branch School (永定分校)

Primary schools

References

Mentougou
Schools